Abja-Paluoja is a town in Mulgi Parish, Viljandi County, in southern Estonia. Before 2017, it was the administrative centre of Abja Parish.

Abja-Paluoja was first mentioned in 1505. Abja-Paluoja gained town rights in 1993 and became a sovereign municipality but in 1998 it was merged into surrounding rural municipality Abja Parish.

Since 1940, the Abja Gymnasium has offered secondary education. The kindergarten in Abja-Paluoja was founded in 1912.

Writer, journalist and cartoonist Karl August Hindrey was born at Abja Manor in 1875. Historian Mati Laur was born in Abja-Paluoja in 1955. Filmmaker, producer, screenwriter, journalist, and historian Riho Västrik was born in Abja-Paluoja in 1965. Diplomat and foreign intelligence officer Kaimo Kuusk was born in Abja-Paluoja in 1975.

Gallery

References

External links
Abja Gymnasium 

Cities and towns in Estonia
Former municipalities of Estonia
1993 establishments in Estonia
Kreis Pernau